Lisa Trusel (born October 25, 1968) is an American actress. She is best known for her Emmy nominated role as Melissa Horton on the NBC soap opera Days of Our Lives.

Personal life
Trusel married her former Days co-star,  David Wallace, on November 1, 1986. They have four children: Ryan Elizabeth (born December 1989), Benjamin (born c. 1991), Emma (born c. 1993), and Joseph (born c. 1997).  As of 2015, they have three grandchildren.

Career
She was a young member of the cast of the hit television show Father Murphy during the early 1980s, playing the character Lizette Winkler. She later became a regular character on the daytime television soap opera, Days of Our Lives, playing the character Melissa Phillips Anderson Horton for which she was Emmy nominated Outstanding Younger Actress in a Drama Series in 1985.

Filmography
 1981 - 1983: Father Murphy as Lizette Winkler (31 episodes)
 1983: The Rousters as Darlene
 1983 - 1988: Days of Our Lives as Melissa Horton (Role since:  1982 - 1988, 1994, 1996, 1997, 2002, January 2010, June 17, 2010)
 1989: TV 101 as Jamie Myers (4 episodes)

References

External links 
 Lisa Trusel screenshots from Days of our Lives.

1968 births
American soap opera actresses
American television actresses
Living people
21st-century American women